bloomingOUT is an LGBT+ radio show broadcast on WFHB in Bloomington, Indiana, United States.  It is dedicated to the LGBTQ+ life, including history, current issues, culture, and more.  It began broadcasting on October 7, 2003 and continues to air every Thursday from 6:00 - 7:00 PM EST.

The show generally includes 1-2 interviews, 1-2 segments, news, music, and calendar. bloomingOUT exists to educate, entertain, and stimulate listeners to engage in dialogue about real issues and events relevant to the LGBTQ+ and ally community. It strives to maintain an upbeat, informative, and entertaining show that facilitates communication and can be enjoyed by all. The show offers everyone a clear perspective into the culture, diversity, and humanity of the LGBTQ+ community. Because bloomingOUT is the only such media program in Indiana, and one of the few in the nation, it includes issues, views, and news that do not usually appear in mainstream media.

bloomingOUT History
Carol Fischer and Helen Harrell founded the show in 2003. WFHB is located in downtown Bloomington, IN. Bloomington has received attention for its tolerance of LGBTQ people and culture.  In the 1990s, Bloomington added sexual orientation to its human rights ordinance.  The city launched the LGBT film fest (PRIDE) in 2004, which continues to this day. The town has one gay bar.

BloomingOUT has co-sponsored and provided entertainment for the 2005 and 2006 Bloomington Pride picnics which took place on the 4th of July in their respective years, and have partnerships with The Word, Pride of Indy Band and Color Guard as well as OutMedia and Bloomington Hospital's Positive Link. It is currently supported by The Backdoor, IU Health Bloomington, and the School of Public Health at Indiana University.

Current bloomingOUT staff and hosts
 Executive Producer & WFHB News Director - Kade Young
 Producer - Melanie Davis
 Board Engineer - Lucas Fisher 
 Anchor - Melanie Davis 
 Anchor - Justin Robertson
 Anchor - Ireland Meacham
 Anchor - Lucas Fisher

Active Segments
 Open Doors by David Crosman, Meredith Seamon, Stormy Dayhuff, Matt Peterson, and Taylor Hurt

Inactive Segments
(Not a complete list.)
 Out on Campus by Frankie Salzmann and Arielle Soussan
 Dear Straight People by Andrew Sims
 First Year Out by Nick Tumino
 Queer His/Herstory by Helen Harrell
 Coming Out of the Deviant's Closet by Victor Kinzer
 Critical Inqueery with Mark Brostoff & Helen Harrell
 Transformation Station with Ethan B.
 Our View by Jim Doud
 A Road for the Roadless by Abigail A. Sewell
 Verbal Terrorism: Poetry by Jada B.
 LGBT Book Zone by Tiffany Dow
 The Heart of Polyamory with Millie Jackson
 Youth In Peril with Greg Chafin (on-going series)
 Student Talk
 The Soul of Us  On-going series of interviews with members of the faith community - 1st Thursday of every month
 Reclaiming Our Faith by Mark Lee
 In Transit by Deane Lahre
 Gay Destinations by Mark Brostoff
 Navajo Rainbow by Wesley Thomas
 Queering Culture by Victor Kinzer
 Student Talk by Kim Ruggles
 Gendered Variations by Corinne Datchi-Phillips
 Facing AIDS by Mark Lee
 It's Only Sex by Emily Nagoski
 What's Going On by Nita McB
 Legislative Update by Carolyn Wiethoff
 Straight Talk by Aimee Stanton
 The Bi Connection by Eric D. & Emily Cohen
 Chronicles of Rachael, Adventures of a Transwoman in the Heartland by Rachael

References

External links
bloomingOUT
Facebook
Twitter
bloomingOUT on WFHB
iTunes

American talk radio programs
LGBT in Indiana
LGBT-related mass media in the United States
LGBT-related radio programs
2000s LGBT-related mass media